Massimo Cosmelli (born 6 August 1943) is a retired Italian basketball player. He won a bronze medal at the 1971 European Championships and finished fourth at the 1965 European Championships and eighth at the 1968 Summer Olympics.

References

1943 births
Living people
Sportspeople from Livorno
Italian men's basketball players
1967 FIBA World Championship players
1970 FIBA World Championship players
Olympic basketball players of Italy
Basketball players at the 1968 Summer Olympics
Pallacanestro Milano 1958 players